The small dusty wave (Idaea seriata) is a moth of the family Geometridae first described by Franz von Paula Schrank in 1802. It is found throughout Western, Central and Northern Europe. In the north, its range extends as far as Denmark and southern Scandinavia. In the east its range extends as far as Russia (Moscow or Veliky Novgorod). Idaea seriata is replaced by the subspecies Idaea seriata canteneraria, from the north-east of Spain and the central and eastern Mediterranean (including the islands, except Crete) to the Crimean peninsula, while the western Mediterranean and the Balearic Islands are inhabited by the sister species Idaea minuscularia. Outside Europe it is found in eastern Algeria, Tunisia, Turkey, Cyprus, the Caucasus and the northwest of Transcaucasia. In Morocco and western Algeria, it is replaced by the sister species Idaea minuscularia. In the British Isles it is common in England and Wales but is only found in the eastern half of Scotland and it is rare in Ireland.

The species is very small (wingspan 19–21 mm) and is probably one of the least striking members of the whole family, being basically grey with all markings indistinct apart from the black discal spot typical of the genus. Either one or two broods are produced each year and the species can be seen on the wing any time from June to September, flying at night and sometimes coming to light.

The larva feeds on ivy and the species overwinters in this form.

The flight season refers to the British Isles. This may vary in other parts of the range.

Subspecies
I. s. canteneraria
I. s. seriata

References
Chinery, Michael Collins Guide to the Insects of Britain and Western Europe 1986 (Reprinted 1991)
Skinner, Bernard Colour Identification Guide to Moths of the British Isles 1984

External links

Small dusty wave at UKMoths
Fauna Europaea
Moths and Butterflies of Europe and North Africa
Lepiforum e.V.

Sterrhini
Moths described in 1802
Moths of Europe
Moths of Asia
Moths of Africa
Taxa named by Franz von Paula Schrank